Nephrotoma appendiculata, the spotted crane fly, is a species of crane fly.

Subspecies
Subspecies include: 
Nephrotoma appendiculata appendiculata (Pierre, 1919) (Northwestern Europe and the Near East)
Nephrotoma appendiculata pertenua Oosterbroek, 1978  (Southwestern Europe and North Africa)

Distribution
This species is present in most of Europe, in North Africa and in the Near East.

Habitat
These crane flies inhabit woodland edges,  gardens, fields, rough grassland. and farmland.

Description
The body is yellow with a few short, black stripes on the thorax , a black horseshoe mark on the side and a broad dark stripe on each section of the abdomen. The wings have a thin, yellow line near the leading edge. The wing stigma is usually pale, but sometimes it is dark. 

This species is rather similar to Nephrotoma flavescens.

Biology
Adults can be seen from April to August.  The larvae, known as "leatherjackets", feed on the roots of grasses,  while the adults feed on umbellifers such as cow parsley.

Gallery

References

Tipulidae
Diptera of Europe
Insects described in 1919